One Last Kiss may refer to:

Music
 One Last Kiss (EP), by Utada Hikaru, or the title song, 2021

Songs
 "One Last Kiss" (The J. Geils Band song), 1978
 "Blow Me (One Last Kiss)", by Pink, 2012
 "One Last Kiss", by Katrin Johansson, 2014
 "One Last Kiss", by Kylie Minogue from Golden, 2018
 "One Last Kiss", by Madina Lake from The Disappearance of Adalia, 2006
 "One Last Kiss", by the Other Two from Super Highways, 1999
 "One Last Kiss", by Sofia Shinas, 1992
 "One Last Kiss", by Thomai Apergi, 2013
 "One Last Kiss", written by Charles Strouse and Lee Adams for the stage musical Bye Bye Birdie, 1958

Other uses
 "One Last Kiss" (Full House), a 1990 television episode
 One Last Kiss, a 1998 Fear Street Sagas novel by Brandon Alexander

See also
 Last Kiss (disambiguation)